Route 239 is a collector road in the Canadian province of Nova Scotia.

It is located in the Cape Breton Regional Municipality and connects Gibbon at Route 305 with North West Arm at Route 305.

Local residents often refer to the road as the "Edwardsville Highway" or the "Westmount Road."

Communities
 Gibbon
 Westmount
 Edwardsville
 Point Edward
 North West Arm

Parks
Petersfield Provincial Park

See also
List of Nova Scotia provincial highways

References

Roads in the Cape Breton Regional Municipality
Nova Scotia provincial highways